Enrico "Rick" Giancola (born September 18, 1946) is an American former college football coach. He served as the  head football coach at Montclair State University in Montclair, New Jersey from 1983 to 2022, compiling a record of 260–143–2. He is the longest-tenured coach in history of the Montclair State Red Hawks football program and has the most wins of any coach in program history. Giancola's teams won 11 New Jersey Athletic Conference (NJAC) championships.

Head coaching record

See also
 List of college football coaches with 200 wins

References

External links
 Montclair State profile

1946 births
Living people
Montclair State Red Hawks football coaches
Rowan Profs football players